Darwin Del Fabro is a queer Brazilian actor and singer known for his gender non-conforming acting roles.

Early life 
Darwin Del Fabro was born in Santa Maria, Rio Grande do Sul, Brazil. Both of his parents are fashion models and met while they were working in New York. His father became an actor and he was raised by his stepmother who had her own television show in Brazil.

At the age of 14, he moved alone to Rio de Janeiro to further his career. He studied Portuguese literature at the Universidade Candido Mendes in Rio as well as classical and contemporary ballet.

Career 
Del Fabro won a singing contest when he was three years old and made his professional debut in the musical Era no tempo do rei, directed by João Fonseca at the Joãn Caetano Theater in Rio de Janeiro. He studied theater with Daniel Herz at  where he performed in two plays, A Outra and Lapso de Mim Mesmo. He also performed in the original Brazilian production of Shrek the Musical, as well as Fiddler on the Roof, and The Wizard of Oz. At age 14, Del Fabro created a play that, years later, was later performed in New York City where he met writer/director John Logan.

Del Fabro produced, directed and starred in the musical Be Careful, It's My Heart in 2015. The show was also adapted into an album and released the following year.

In 2016, Del Fabro played the role of Einar Wegener in the Sesc Copacabana's stage production of Lili based on the diaries of Lili Elbe in Rio De Janeiro.

Del Fabro was cast in his first television role playing Collete D'or (Astolfo Lemos) in the 2016 TV Globo miniseries Ligações Perigosas, which was inspired by the French novel Dangerous Liaisons. In preparation to play the role, Del Fabro joined a running group and lost five pounds. He also bought high heels, necklaces, bracelets, earrings, makeup to further immerse himself in the character.

The following year he starred as Castrato in the Brazilian television soap opera Novo Mudo, which aired on TV Globo.

In 2017, Del Fabro moved to New York City where he enrolled in the musical theater program at the Broadway Dance Center taking 24 classes per week while also learning to speak English. The following year he performed at Feinstein's 54/Below to promote his third album, Darwin Del Fabro in NY. He later starred as Puck in the Juneberry Collective production of A Midsummer Night's Dream, and as Adam in The Feather Doesn't Fall Far from the Tree produced at New York's Signature Theatre Company. In 2019, he starred as Domenic in the off-Broadway play Real, produced by The Tank.

Del Fabro secured his first U.S. film role as Gabriel Hernandez in the slasher film They/Them, written and directed by John Logan. The role was specifically written for Del Fabro. The film debuted on the Peacock Network in August 2022.

In 2022, Del Fabro released his third album, a collection of songs by the Brazilian artist, Antônio Carlos Jobim. All of the songs on the album were recorded in Los Angeles over a period of two weeks.

Personal life 
Del Fabro's native language is Portuguese. He learned to speak English after moving to New York City in 2017 to pursue a career as a performer. Del Fabro is queer.

Albums 
 Be Careful, It's My Heart (2016)
Darwin Del Fabro in Rio (2017)
Revisiting Jobim (2022)

References

External links 
 
 

Living people
Brazilian LGBT actors
People from Santa Maria, Rio Grande do Sul
Queer actors
Year of birth missing (living people)